Robert Van Horne was an American football coach.  He was the first head football coach at Morningside College in Sioux City, Iowa.  He held that position for the 1898 and 1900 seasons; there was no team on record for the 1899 season.

Head coaching record

References

Year of birth missing
Year of death missing
Morningside Mustangs football coaches